Carrossel is the ninth studio album released by Brazilian rock band Skank, the last in the "deconstruction trilogy" begun with Maquinarama in which the group changed from ska towards a more rock-oriented sound influenced by The Beatles and Clube da Esquina. Carrossel was the fifth best-selling album in São Paulo in 2006, peaking at second place.

Other than Samuel Rosa's usual songwriting partner Chico Amaral, there are contributions from Nando Reis, Humberto Effe, César Maurício, Arnaldo Antunes and Rodrigo Leão.

The track "Trancoso" was written with Arnaldo Antunes at Trancoso beach. The album's released singles are "Mil acasos", "Seus passos" and "Uma canção é pra isso" - the latter received a video which was nominated for the 2006 MTV Video Music Brazil award.

Track listing 
All songs written and composed by Samuel Rosa and Chico Amaral, except where noted.

References

2006 albums
Skank (band) albums